Statistics of Czechoslovak First League in the 1946–47 season.

Overview
It was contested by 14 teams, and Slavia Prague won the championship. Josef Bican was the league's top scorer with 43 goals.

AC Sparta toured Great Britain opening with a 2 – 2 draw against Arsenal on 2 October 1946.

Stadia and locations

League standings

Results

Top goalscorers

References

Czechoslovakia - List of final tables (RSSSF)

Czechoslovak First League seasons
Czechoslovak First League, 1946-47
1946–47 in Czechoslovak football